The Southern Regnitz is a river of Czech Republic and Germany. Its source is near the village Hranice, Cheb District. It forms the border of Germany with the Czech Republic in the extreme northeast of Bavaria and then runs into Bavaria to join the Saale river near the city of Hof.

See also
List of rivers of Bavaria

References

Rivers of Bavaria
Rivers of the Karlovy Vary Region
Rivers of Germany
International rivers of Europe
Czech Republic–Germany border
Border rivers